Styn may refer to:

 John Styn, American blogger and web designer
 Stijn "Styn" Derksen, member of the Dutch music duo Mae Seven

See also
 Stynes
 Steins (disambiguation)